Khondaker Mosharraf Hossain (20 November 1981 – 19 April 2022), nicknamed Rubel, was a  Bangladeshi cricketer. He was a left-handed batsman and slow left arm orthodox bowler. He had played five One Day International (ODI) matches for Bangladesh.

Career
After making his debut in 2001–02, he appeared for Dhaka Division up to the end of the 2006–07 season with a season for Barisal Division in 2004–05. He represented Bangladesh A in 2005–06 and 2006–07. He was a regular face in the first class cricket, where he picked up 392 wickets at an average of 29.02 in 112 matches.

He took three five wicket hauls in first-class cricket, with a best of 9–105 against Chittagong Division in an innings where he also took 10 wickets in that match.  He's also made three first-class fifties, with a top score of 85 against Chittagong Division.

On 9 March 2008, he made his debut in One Day International (ODI) against South Africa. On 1 October 2016, against Afghanistan, he made his comeback in the national side when he played his second ODI match after a nearly eight-year gap, since his debut in 2008 against South Africa.

In October 2018, he was named in the squad for the Comilla Victorians team, following the draft for the 2018–19 Bangladesh Premier League.

Illness and premature death
In March 2019, Mosharraf was diagnosed with a brain tumour. Later, He returned to cricket after going through a brain surgery from Mount Elizabeth Hospital in Singapore. However, in November 2021, he went through another brain surgery from a hospital in Chennai. Hossain was receiving chemotherapy regularly but as his health suddenly deteriorated, he was admitted to the intensive care unit (ICU) of United Hospital in Dhaka. On 15 March 2022, he was admitted to the ICU of Square Hospital. On 19 April 2022, he died after suffering from the prolonged brain tumor.

References

External links

1981 births
2022 deaths
Bangladeshi cricketers
Bangladesh One Day International cricketers
Dhaka Division cricketers
Barisal Division cricketers
Dhaka Dominators cricketers
Cricketers from Dhaka
Legends of Rupganj cricketers
ICL Bangladesh XI cricketers
Dhaka Warriors cricketers
Bangladesh Central Zone cricketers
Khulna Tigers cricketers
Comilla Victorians cricketers
Deaths from brain cancer in Bangladesh